Joshua 3 is the third chapter of the Book of Joshua in the Hebrew Bible or in the Old Testament of the Christian Bible. According to Jewish tradition, the book was attributed to the Joshua, with additions by the high priests Eleazar and Phinehas, but modern scholars view it as part of the Deuteronomistic History, which spans the books of Deuteronomy to 2 Kings, attributed to nationalistic and devotedly Yahwistic writers during the time of the reformer Judean king Josiah in 7th century BCE. This chapter focuses on the Israelites crossing the Jordan River westward into the land of Canaan under the leadership of Joshua, a part of a section comprising Joshua 1:1–5:12 about the entry to the land of Canaan.

Text
This chapter was originally written in the Hebrew language. It is divided into 17 verses.

Textual witnesses
Some early manuscripts containing the text of this chapter in Hebrew are of the Masoretic Text tradition, which includes the Codex Cairensis (895), Aleppo Codex (10th century), and Codex Leningradensis (1008). Fragments containing parts of this chapter in Hebrew were found among the Dead Sea Scrolls including 4Q48 (4QJosh; 100–50 BCE) with extant verses 15–17.

Extant ancient manuscripts of a translation into Koine Greek known as the Septuagint (originally was made in the last few centuries BCE) include Codex Vaticanus (B; B; 4th century) and Codex Alexandrinus (A; A; 5th century). Fragments of the Septuagint Greek text containing this chapter is found in manuscripts such as Washington Manuscript I (5th century CE), and a reduced version of the Septuagint text is found in the illustrated Joshua Roll.

Analysis
The narrative of Israelites entering the land of Canaan comprises verses 1:1 to 5:12 of the Book of Joshua and has the following outline:

A. Preparations for Entering the Land (1:1–18)
1. Directives to Joshua (1:1–9)
2. Directives to the Leaders (1:10–11)
3. Discussions with the Eastern Tribes (1:12–18)
B. Rahab and the Spies in Jericho (2:1–24)
1. Directives to the Spies (2:1a)
2. Deceiving the King of Jericho (2:1b–7)
3. The Oath with Rahab (2:8–21)
4. The Report to Joshua (2:22–24)
C. Crossing the Jordan (3:1–4:24)
1. Initial Preparations for Crossing (3:1–6)
2. Directives for Crossing (3:7–13)
3. A Miraculous Crossing: Part 1 (3:14–17)
4. Twelve-Stone Memorial: Part 1 (4:1–10a)
5. A Miraculous Crossing: Part 2 (4:10b–18)
6. Twelve-Stone Memorial: Part 2 (4:19–24)
D. Circumcision and Passover (5:1–12)
1. Canaanite Fear (5:1)
2. Circumcision (5:2–9)
3. Passover (5:10–12)

Preparations and directives of the crossing (3:1–13)

The crossing of the Jordan narrative (3:1–5:1) consists of several units that backtrack and overlap, with a number of elements recounted more than once (e.g. the selection of men to carry the stones, 3:12; 4:2; the setting up of the stones, 4:8–9, 20). It includes a miraculous parting of the waters (Joshua 3:16) which recalls the crossing of the Reed Sea (Exodus 14:21–22; cf. Psalm 114:3, 5; Micah 6:4–5), to be followed by the first Passover kept in the new land (Joshua 5:10-12) corresponding to the first ever Passover in Egypt (Exodus 12–13). The centrality of the  Ark of the Covenant in the whole narrative emphasizes the guidance of YHWH on the way into the land, and the preparation for the Holy War ahead (verse 10; Numbers 10:33–36), although the differences in the terminology of the ark throughout this chapter may indicate diverse origins:
Verse 3: Ark of the covenant of YHWH
Verses 6,8: Ark of the covenant
Verse 11: Ark of the covenant of the Lord of all the earth
Verse 13: Ark of YHWH, the Lord of all the earth
Verse 15: Ark 
Verse 17: The ark of the covenant of YHWH

The crossing narrative is connected to that of the spies (chapter 2) by the mention of Shittim (3:1), as well as bringing Joshua, together with 'all the Israelites', to the verge of Jordan for the crossing (cf. verse 17), where the officers play their part to observe the due timing of three days (verses 2–3; cf. 1:10–11). The crossing respects the requirements of holiness, the ark being attended by the properly authorized personnel (verses. 3, 6; cf. Numbers 3:5–10, 31), and the people keeping due distance, recalling the encounter with YHWH at Sinai (cf. Exodus 19:10–12). The preparations also include a reaffirmation of Joshua's leadership, and of YHWH's special promise to accompany him (3:7; cf. 1:5) throughout his conquest (verses 10–11; cf. Exodus 3:17). The phrase 'the LORD, the Lord of all the earth' (verse 13; cf. Micah 4:13; Psalm 97:5) states a claim to absolute universal dominion, as also found in other ancient Near-Eastern documents for local deities, for examples, Baal in Ugarit literature is written as zbl b'I arș ('the prince, lord of the earth').

Verse 1
And Joshua rose early in the morning; and they removed from Shittim, and came to Jordan, he and all the children of Israel, and lodged there before they passed over.
"Joshua rose early in the morning": a phrase that was used multiple times in the Book of Joshua (3:1; 6:12; 7:16; 8:10) showing 'his eagerness to act promptly and in full accord with divine instructions.
"Shittim": identified as modern "Tell el-Ḥammām", on the eastern side of Jordan valley, opposite Jericho. Here it is written in the same short form as in Numbers 25:1, not in the longer form as in Numbers 33:49.

Crossing the Jordan (3:14–17)

After all the preparations, an initial report of the crossing was given, with a note that it was miraculous, as the river being in its spring flood (verse 15) was suddenly cut off of its flow of water, leaving a dry land to walk on (verse 16). This passage anticipates a fuller account in the following chapter.

Verses 14–16
 So when the people set out from their tents to pass over the Jordan with the priests bearing the ark of the covenant before the people,  and as soon as those bearing the ark had come as far as the Jordan, and the feet of the priests bearing the ark were dipped in the brink of the water (now the Jordan overflows all its banks throughout the time of harvest),  the waters coming down from above stood and rose up in a heap very far away, at Adam, the city that is beside Zarethan, and those flowing down toward the Sea of the Arabah, the Salt Sea, were completely cut off. And the people passed over opposite Jericho.
"The waters coming down from above stood and rose up in a heap": Many times in recorded history, earthquakes caused landslides and other disruptions leading to a blockage of the Jordan River for one or two days (and also the fall of Jericho walls). Humphreys relates this to Psalm 114:1, 3 ("When Israel went out of Egypt,... Jordan was driven back.")
Garstang reported a blockage of Jordan in 1927, and a report by an Arabic historian, Nowairi, related to the building of a bridge in 1266 over the Jordan in Damieh on the order of Baybars I, king of Mamluk Egypt and Syria (1260-1277), that on the night of 7 Desember 1267, one part of the wall on the side fell into the river and caused the flow to be dammed from midnight to "the fourth hour" (about 10:30 in the morning), which provided the opportunity to repair the bridge. In 1546 a strong earthquake, documented in three separate sources, caused the damming of Jordan. One source is a letter in Italian sent to a nobleman in Venice and published in Wittenberg, Germany, in 1546, stating that Jordan River was dry for two days, whereas a Spanish document describing the same event notes that the river stopped for one full day, and the third source in Hebrew by Isaac Levy and published in 1562 states that foreigners reported about the Jordan river being dry for three days, because two big hills fell into the river. The reports indicate that the flow of Jordan can be blocked due to landslide or earthquake.

See also

Related Bible parts: Exodus 12, Exodus 14, Joshua 1

Notes

References

Sources

External links
 Jewish translations:
 Yehoshua - Joshua - Chapter 3 (Judaica Press). Hebrew text and English translation [with Rashi's commentary] at Chabad.org
 Christian translations:
 Online Bible at GospelHall.org (ESV, KJV, Darby, American Standard Version, Bible in Basic English)
 Joshua chapter 3. Bible Gateway

03
Phoenicians in the Hebrew Bible